Naan Sigappu Manithan is a 1985 Indian Tamil-language action thriller film written and directed by S. A. Chandrasekhar. The film stars Rajinikanth, K. Bhagyaraj and Ambika, with music by Ilaiyaraaja. It was a commercial success at the box office. The film is a remake of 1984 Hindi film Aaj Ki Awaaz. Vijay played a child artist role in this film.

Plot 
Vijay, a Tamil professor lives with his widowed mother and his sister Shanti. He is in love with Uma, a lawyer. During a visit to his friend Ravi's house, Vijay is disgusted by the Illicit liquor and prostitution in the neighbourhood and complaints to the police, but they do not pay heed as they are on the corruption's payroll and manages to warn them before making a raid. Ravi's sister is killed and the perpetrator named Mohanraj gets off scot-free with help from a minister. 

Enraged, Vijay and Ravi take matters into their own hands and clean up the liquor trade and brothel on their own. Mohanraj and his goons barges into Vijay's house where they kill his mother and assault Shanti, who later commits suicide by jumping from the terrace. Vijay then turns into a vigilante, walking the streets at nights and dealing out his own brand of justice – shoot first and ask questions latter to the gangsters, where he soon becomes known as Robin Hood. 

Meanwhile, the police department assigns Singaaram, a CID officer, to unmask Robin Hood. Vijay kills Mohanraj and his uncle, after which he surrenders to Singaram revealing the truth, but Singaram mentions that he had already found the truth and decided not to arrest Vijay as he destroy the "weeds" that are harmful to the society, but Vijay feels guilty for his murders and surrenders himself. Uma appears in court in favour of Vijay and argues. 

The day before the judgment, Singaram masks himself and tries to molest the judge's daughter, seeing which the judge tries to shoot him. Singaram reveals his identity and mentions that his intention was to make the judge understand that Vijay was also under a similar situation before. The judge sentences Vijay for lifetime imprisonment, but recommends to the President of India for granting a pardon.

Cast

Production 
Though Rajinikanth stopped working in "double-hero" films by the mid-1980s, he accepted to work on this film, which had Bhagyaraj in another leading role, "without any alterations" to the script.

Themes 
Writing for Jump Cut, Kumuthan Maderya noted Naan Sigappu Manithans similarities to the American film Death Wish (1974) and its sequel Death Wish II (1982). According to him, one factor that differentiates Naan Sigappu Manithan from those films is the "unleashing of nationalist angst in a climactic courtroom drama scene".

Soundtrack 
The music was composed by Ilaiyaraaja.

Reception 
Jayamanmadhan of Kalki said the film would run for Rajinikanth and Bhagyaraj.

References

External links 
 

1980s crime thriller films
1980s Tamil-language films
1980s vigilante films
1985 action thriller films
1985 films
Fictional portrayals of the Tamil Nadu Police
Fictional vigilantes
Films about rape in India
Films set in 1985
Films set in Chennai
Indian action thriller films
Indian courtroom films
Indian crime thriller films
Indian rape and revenge films
Indian vigilante films
Films scored by Ilaiyaraaja
Tamil remakes of Hindi films